Ioseb Raminovich "Soso" Pavliashvili (born 29 June 1964 in Tbilisi) is a Russian singer of ethnic Georgian descent.

Soso Pavliashvili was born 29 June 1964 in the Georgian capital of Tbilisi. He graduated from Tbilisi State Conservatoire as a violinist. Pavliashvili became a public figure at the age of 24 as a member of the ensemble Iveria. He achieved his first serious success in 1989 after speech on a poetry delivered at the Jurmala Young Pop Singer Competition. first album was released in 1993.

Over the course of his career Soso Pavliashvili has released a total of eight studio albums. He has worked with such artists as Mikhail Tanich, Viktor Reznikov, Simon Osiashvili, Georgi Karapetyan, Konstantin Gubin, and March Kavaleryan, among others.

Soso Pavliashvili splits his time between Tbilisi and Moscow, living in the latter city. He has 1 son and 2 daughters.

References

External links

 Soso Pavliashvili at the last.fm

1964 births
Living people
Musicians from Tbilisi
Russian people of Georgian descent
Russian pop singers
Russian folk-pop singers
Soviet male singers
Soviet pop singers
Russian male actors
20th-century Russian male singers
20th-century Russian singers